Kavita Singh (born 5 November 1964) is Professor of art history and served as the Dean at the School of Arts and Aesthetics of Jawaharlal Nehru University (JNU).

Education
She obtained her Bachelor of Arts degree at Lady Shri Ram College, her MFA in 1987 from M.S. University, Baroda and her PhD in 1996 from Punjab University.

Career
She was appointed to JNU in 2001. Her research interests cover the history of Indian painting, particularly the Mughal and Rajput schools, and the history and politics of museums, with special reference to India.

Before joining JNU, Singh was  Research Editor for Marg Publications, and Visiting Guest Curator at the San Diego Museum of Art during which time she co-curated the exhibition Power and Desire: South Asian Paintings from the San Diego Museum of Art, Edwin Binney 3rd Collection. The exhibition ran in New York from 10 October 2000 to 7 January 2001. A catalogue by Omina Okada appeared subsequently.

In 2007, Kavita Singh led a curatorial team for the second exhibition of the newly opened Devi Art Foundation. The exhibition had the title Where in the World. An abridged version of Kavita Singh's introduction to the catalogue appeared online. From 2009-12 she was a partner with the Kunsthistorisches Institut in Florenz of the Max Planck Society with Professor Dr. Gerhard Wolf and Hannah Baader for a project called The Temple and the Museum: Sites for Art in India.

Recognition
In 2018, she was awarded the Infosys Prize  in Humanities for her work in the field of art history and visual culture.
She has received fellowships and scholarships from the Getty Research Institute, the Sterling and Francine Clark Art Institute, Williams College, the Nehru Trust for the Indian Collections at the Victoria and Albert Museum and the Asia Society in New York.

References

Indian art historians
Living people
Indian women historians
20th-century Indian historians
20th-century Indian women scientists
20th-century Indian scientists
Panjab University alumni
Historians of Indian art
20th-century women writers
1964 births